is a town located in Shiribeshi Subprefecture, Hokkaido, Japan. Kyōgoku sits at the eastern foot of Mount Yōtei, an active stratovolcano volcano which dominates the skyline of the town.

The town borders the south ward (Minami-ku) of Sapporo, but car traffic from Kyōgoku must drive over an hour through the Nakayama Toge mountain pass to enter Sapporo.

Tourists visit the town to drink the spring water in Fukidashi Park, where the water from Mount Yōtei bubbles out of the ground.

The town has a sister city relationship with the city of Marugame in Kagawa Prefecture.

Geography

Kyōgoku is mountainous, with several peaks above . The town sits between Mount Yotei to the east, and Mount Muine, Mount Nakadake , and Mount Kimobetsu to the west.

The Shiribetsu River, which emerges from Lake Shikotsu to the south, runs through Kyōgoku between Mount Yotei and the western peaks in the town. The river eventually flows into the Sea of Japan.

Neighboring municipalities
Ishikari Subprefecture:
Sapporo (Minami-ku)
Shiribeshi Subprefecture:
Yoichi District: Akaigawa
Abuta District: Kutchan
Abuta District: Kimobetsu
The town also borders Niseko and Makkari at a single point at the top of Mount Yōtei.

History

Kyōgoku was first settled by the Japanese in 1897. Takanori Kyōgoku (1858-1928) was a former noble of the Kyōgoku clan and head of the Marugame Domain, Sanuki Province in present-day Kagawa Prefecture, Shikoku. Kyōgoku was given permission to set up an agricultural operation in the area, as part of Kutchan.
 1898,1899,1900 - Three waves of settlement from Ishikawa Prefecture and Toyama Prefecture
 1910 - With a population of 6,783, the new settlement becomes a separate village called Higashikutchan.
 1940 - The village is renamed Kyōgoku.
 1962 - Kyōgoku becomes a town.

Transportation

Public transport

Kyōgoku is not connected by rail to other areas of Hokkaido. The town was formerly a stop on the Japanese National Railways (JR) Iburi Line which ceased operation in 1986.

Highways

Japan National Route 227, a national highway of Japan, runs through the east of Kyōgoku and connects the town to Hakodate and Esashi.

Education
Elementary schools:
 Kyōgoku Elementary School
 Minami Kyōgoku Elementary School (permanently closed)

Junior high school:
Kyōgoku Junior High School

Annual events
 Town recreation day - summer and winter
 Attakai festival - held in March
 Fukidashi choral singing festival - held in July on the outdoor stage in Fukidashi park
 Shakkoi festival - also held in July in Fukidashi park
 Furusato festival - held during the Obon season in August on the main shopping street

Sister city 
Marugame in Kagawa Prefecture, Japan

Notable people from Kyōgoku

Akira Satō, ski jumper

References

External links

Official Website 

Towns in Hokkaido